Adisu Bayew (born 27 December 2001), is an Australian professional soccer player who plays as a midfielder for Western United.

References

External links

2001 births
Living people
Australian soccer players
Association football midfielders
Western United FC players
National Premier Leagues players
A-League Men players
Australian people of Ethiopian descent